Saturn return is an astrological phenomenon based on the movement of the planet Saturn, reflecting the age of achieving full adulthood.

Saturn return, Saturn returns, or Saturn's return or variants may also refer to:

Film
 Saturn Returns, a 2001 telemovie with screenplay by Christos Tsiolkas
Saturn Returns (film), a 2009 German/Israeli film by Lior Shamriz

Music
Myths and Hymns, a 1998 song cycle and musical originally known as Saturn Returns
"Saturn Return" (Eraserheads song), 1998 song by Eraserheads from Aloha Milkyway
"Saturn Return", 2001 song by R.E.M. from Reveal
 Saturn Return (album), 2020 album by the Secret Sisters
Saturnz Return, 1998 album by Goldie

Plays
Saturn Returns (play), an American play by Noah Haidle first staged in New York in 2008
Saturn's Return, an Australian play by Tommy Murphy, first staged in Sydney in 2008

Other uses
 Saturn Return (manga), Japanese manga series written and illustrated by Akane Toriaki since 2019

See also
Saturn (disambiguation)
Return of Saturn, 2000 album by No Doubt